Tēvita Fatafehi Puloka is a Tongan politician.

Puloka runs a construction business. He was first elected to the Legislative Assembly of Tonga in the 2021 Tongan general election, winning the Tongatapu 1 seat from Siaosi Pōhiva. He subsequently supported Siaosi Sovaleni for Prime Minister. While offered a cabinet position, he decided to remain outside cabinet.

References

Living people
Members of the Legislative Assembly of Tonga
Year of birth missing (living people)
Independent politicians in Tonga